The S4 is a railway service of RER Vaud that provides hourly service between  and  in the Swiss canton of Vaud. Swiss Federal Railways, the national railway company of Switzerland, operates the service.

Operations 

History 

The "first" S4 was one of the six original lines of the RER Vaud, then called the Vaud Express Network (REV), when that system was established in December 2004. It ran hourly between Morges and Palézieux. SBB extended the S4 west from Morges to Allaman with the December 2011 timetable change, making local stops. Rush-hour service to Romont began on 10 December 2017. In December 2021, SBB increased the number of rush-hour round-trips between Allaman and Romont from three to six.

The RER Vaud lines were substantially reorganized for the December 2022 timetable change. The "new" S4 was a combination of the former S2 and S22, making local stops on the Simplon line between Vallorbe and Lausanne, and limited stops between Lausanne and Aigle, with limited service from Aigle to St-Maurice.

References

External links 

 2023 timetable: Le Brassus–Lausanne and Lausanne–St-Maurice

RER Vaud lines
Transport in the canton of Vaud